I'll Be Your Jukebox Tonight is the 19th solo studio album by American country artist Barbara Mandrell. The album was released in September 1988 on Capitol Records and was produced by Tom Collins. It would be the first of four albums Mandrell released under Capitol.

Background and content 
I'll Be Your Jukebox Tonight was recorded in May 1988 in Nashville, Tennessee, United States. Like her previous release for EMI America Records, Mandrell carried over Tom Collins as her producer for the album, with additional production from Fred Foster on "I Wish I Could Fall in Love Today". The album consisted of 10 tracks. Mandrell's sound for her 1988 release changed to a more traditional country music approach, similar to many other country artists of the time. The album included a cover version of Wynn Stewart's 1961 single, "Big, Big Love", which is the second track on the album. The single, "I Wish That I Could Fall in Love Today" was written by Harlan Howard, who had written songs such as Patsy Cline's "I Fall to Pieces". I'll Be Your Jukebox Tonight was released on a compact disc in 1988 and was also available on LP Record and cassette as well.

I'll Be Your Jukebox Tonight received only two out of five stars by Allmusic.

Release 
I'll Be Your Jukebox Tonight spawned three singles between 1988 and 1989. The lead single "I Wish That I Could Fall in Love Today" was released in July 1988, peaking at #5 on the Billboard Magazine Hot Country Singles & Tracks chart, becoming her first single since 1986 to reach the Top 10. It would also become Mandrell's final Top 10 single. "My Train of Thought" was released as the second single in January 1989, peaking at #19 on the Billboard Country Singles chart and #15 on the Canadian RPM Country Tracks chart. The third single "Mirror, Mirror" was released in May 1989 and peaked at #49 on the Billboard Country chart and became her final charting single in the United States. I'll Be Your Jukebox Tonight was issued in November 1988 and peaked at #35 on the Billboard Magazine Top Country Albums chart.

Track listing 
"I'll Be Your Jukebox Tonight" (James Dean Hicks, Roger Murrah) - 2:21
"Big, Big Love" (Ray Carroll, Wynn Stewart) - 2:26
"Mirror, Mirror" (Bobby Barker, Phil Thomas) - 2:59
"Blanket of Love" (Steve Dean, Keith Stegall) - 3:23
"My Train of Thought" (Bruce Burch, Michael Woody) - 2:36
"I Wish I Could Fall in Love Today" (Harlan Howard) - 2:50
"My Heart Is in the Right Place This Time" (Charlie Craig, Murrah, Stegall) - 2:27
"I Dropped Your Name" (Terry Skinner, Ken Bell) - 2:50
"If We Fall, We Will Fly" (Paul Overstreet, Don Schlitz) - 3:35
"Till It's Love Again" (Richard Leigh, Pat McManus) - 2:16

Personnel
Background Vocals: Steve Dean, Teddy Heard, James Dean Hicks, Wendy Johnson, Barbara Mandrell, Jennifer O'Brien, Keith Palmer, Randy Van Warmer, Hurshel Wiginton
Bass Guitar: David Hungate, Jack Williams
Drums: Eddie Bayers
Fiddle: Rob Hajacos
Guitar: Jimmy Capps, Mark Casstevens, Steve Gibson, Fred Newell
Keyboards: David Briggs, Bobby Ogdin, Hargus "Pig" Robbins
Lead Vocals: Barbara Mandrell
Steel Guitar: Paul Franklin, Barbara Mandrell

Sales chart positions 
Album

Singles

References 

1989 albums
Barbara Mandrell albums
Capitol Records albums
Albums produced by Tom Collins (record producer)